

Movies and television filmed in Dallas
A large number of movies have been filmed in Dallas, Texas, although not all of these are necessarily set in Dallas; for example RoboCop was filmed in Dallas but set in Detroit, Michigan. All of the movies and television shows listed below were filmed in Dallas unless noted otherwise.

 1950, Dallas (movie)
 1959, The Giant Gila Monster
 1959, The Killer Shrews
 1960, My Dog Buddy
 1962, State Fair
 1967, Bonnie and Clyde
 1967, Mars Needs Women
 1973, Executive Action
 1974, Benji
 1974, Phantom of the Paradise
 1976, Logan's Run
 1978, Cotton Candy (film)
 1978-1991 Dallas (TV series)
 1980, The Lathe of Heaven
 1982, Silent Rage
 1983, Silkwood
 1983, Tender Mercies
 1984, Places in the Heart
 1984, Right to Kill?
 1985, Target
 1985, The Trip to Bountiful
 1986, True Stories
 1987, Paramedics
 1987, RoboCop
 1988, Dead Solid Perfect (HBO movie)
 1988–1991, Gerbert (TV series)
 1988, It Takes Two
 1988, Il Nido del Ragno ("The Spider's Nest")
 1988, Talk Radio
 1989, Born on the Fourth of July
 1990, Problem Child
 1991, JFK
 1991, My Heroes Have Always Been Cowboys
 1991, Necessary Roughness
 1991, Steele's Law
 1992–2002, Barney & Friends (TV series)
 1992, Leap of Faith
 1992, Love Crimes
 1992, Love Field
 1992, Ruby
 1993, Hexed
 1993–2001, Walker, Texas Ranger (TV series)
 1994, Blank Check
 1994, Curse of the Starving Class
 1995–1998, Wishbone (TV series)
 1996, Bottle Rocket
 1997, The Apostle
 1997, Asteroid (TV movie)
 1997, Batman & Robin
 1997, It's in the Water
 1998, Point Blank
 1998, The X-Files: Fight the Future
 1999, Any Given Sunday
 1999, Boys Don't Cry
 1999, Olive, the Other Reindeer (TV special; animated in Dallas)
 1999, Universal Soldier: The Return
 1999,  Office Space 
 2000, Dr. T & the Women
 2001, Jimmy Neutron: Boy Genius (animated in Dallas)
 2001, Pendulum
 2002–2007, The Adventures of Jimmy Neutron: Boy Genius (TV series; animated in Dallas)
 2002, The Anarchist Cookbook
 2002, The Rookie
 2002, Serving Sara
 2002, Slap Her... She's French
 2003, Saving Jessica Lynch (TV movie)
 2003, Deadly Cinema (TV series)
 2004, The Ant Bully (animated in Dallas)
 2004, The Benefactor (TV series)
 2004, Primer 
 2006, The Night of the White Pants 
 2006–2008, Prison Break (TV series)
 2009, Fissure
 2010, Earthling
 2010-2011, The Good Guys (TV series)
 2011, The Tree of Life
 2012, 9th Floor: Quest for the Ancient Relic
 2012-2014 Dallas (TV series)
 2013, Hoovey 
 2015, 11.22.63 (Hulu series)
 2015–present, Queen of the South (TV series)
 2017, LBJ 
 2017, The Gifted (TV series; pilot only)

In addition, numerous TV movies and "B movies" have been filmed in Dallas, as well as a few lesser-known, short-lived TV series.

Dallas, Texas
 
Films